Daniel Abraham may refer to:
 Daniel Abraham (author) (born 1969), science fiction and fantasy author, who also writes as part of the joint-pseudonym James S.A. Corey
 Daniel Abraham (rugby league) (born 1981), Australian rugby league footballer
 Daniel Abraham (conductor) (born 1968), director of the Bach Sinfonia and director of choral activities at American University in Washington, D.C.
 S. Daniel Abraham (born 1924), American businessman
 Daniel Abraham (cyclist) (born 1985), Dutch-Eritrean cyclist
 Daniel Abraham (bishop), Indian Bishop of Tirunelveli from 1975 to 1984